The Curiel family (Dutch: Curiël or also known as: da Costa) is a prominent Sephardi Jewish family.

Until the late 18th century, the family held diplomatic positions for the Portuguese Crown in Hamburg and Amsterdam.

History 
The family's origins date back to the 14th century in Curiel de Duero, Castile, Spain. Part of the Sephardic community in Spain, the Curiel family settled in Coimbra, Portugal after the 1492 Spanish decree that ordered the expulsion of all Jews who refused conversion to Catholicism. Abraham Curiel was an eminent physician in Lisbon and ensured that his children practiced Judaism. They were ennobled in 1641 by João IV of Portugal and hold noble titles in Portugal, Spain and the Netherlands. The Curiel family has links to banking and commerce, the arts, literature and politics.

In 1647, David Curiel financed the Spanish delegation to the Peace of Westphalia. Many members of the family sponsored Hebrew scholarship and practiced Judaism, either openly or as crypto-Jews.

Hamburg 
Historian Jonathan Israel wrote that in the seventeenth century, "the new Hamburg synagogue, a place of worship for some eight hundred Sephardi Jews, was filled with emblems and reminders of the Curiel family. The eternal lamp, the Ner Tamid, was provided by Jacob Curiel, as was the oil for keeping the lamp burning. And also the bimah that stood at the centre of the synagogue, the shelves which lined it being reserved for the use of Jacob and his family."

Amsterdam 
Israel wrote that Moses Curiel of Amsterdam was "renowned for his wealth, the prestige he enjoyed among non-Jews (the Stadholder William III stayed at his house for three days during one of his later visits to Amsterdam), and his handsome donations to the Amsterdam Portuguese Synagogue, his name figured constantly in Dutch Jewish community life and synagogue politics for over half a century."  He continues: "his opulent residence on the Nieuwe Herengracht, then called the Joden Herengracht, in Amsterdam, testified to the seigneurial grandeur of his life-style and his pretensions to leadership among the Portuguese Jewish 'nation' as the community was known in Holland."

Israel noted that Nathan Curiel possessed a 'medieval illuminated Hebrew Bible of expectational beauty' which his father, Moses Curiel, had purchased from a Spanish Jew from North Africa. According to Israel, this Bible is considered 'the oldest and most venerable item possessed by Dutch Jewry.'

Notable members 

Israel ben Meir di Curiel (1501–1573), rabbi at Safed, Ottoman Palestine
Jacob Curiel of Coimbra (1514-1576), Portuguese merchant and pirate
Jerónimo de Curiel (c. 1530-1578), Spanish merchant and diplomat 
Alonso de Curiel (d. 1603), Spanish merchant and diplomat, son of Diego de Curiel
Francisco de Vitoria (1540-1592), Roman Catholic Bishop, brother of Abraham Curiel
Abraham Curiel (1545-1609), Portuguese physician
Juan Alfonso de Curiel (d. 1609) Professor of philosophy at the University of Salamanca, converted to Catholicism
 David Curiel (1594-1666), Portuguese merchant and diplomat
 Jacob Curiel (1587-1664), Portuguese merchant and diplomat
 Moses Curiel (1620-1697), Portuguese merchant and diplomat
Alexandre Nunes da Costa (1655-1712), alias Selomoh Curiel, merchant and diplomat
Luis Curiel (1655-1724), Spanish lawyer and diplomat, converted to Catholicism
Nathan Curiel (1666-1737), diplomat and collector of antiques
Juan Curiel (1690-1775), Spanish intellectual and founding member of the Royal Spanish Academy, son of Luis

See also 

 Abravanel family
 Auerbach family
 Fould family
 Rothschild family

References

Further reading 

 I. Da Costa, Noble Families Among the Sephardi Jews, (Gordon Press Publishers, 1976), 
 Daniel M. Swetschinski, Reluctant Cosmopolitans: The Portuguese Jews of Seventeenth-century Amsterdam, (Littman Library of Jewish Civilization, 2004), 
Jonathan Israel, Conflicts of Empires: Spain, the Low Countries and the Struggle for World Supremacy, 1585-1713, (A&C Black, 1997)
Israel, Lopo Ramirez (David Curiel) and the Attempt to Establish a Sephardi Community in Antwerp in 1653-1654, (Peeters Publishers, 1994)

External links 

 Archives tagged "curiel family" at The National Archives (UK)
Curiel family at Jewish Virtual Library

 
Jewish Portuguese history
Jewish Dutch history
Jewish Spanish history
Sephardi families
Jewish families
Banking families
Spanish Jews
Portuguese Jews
British Jewish families
Dutch Sephardi Jews
European noble families
Portuguese noble families